Abraham Minis may refer to:
 Abraham Minis (born 1694)  (1694–1757), European settler in the colony of Savannah, Georgia
 Abraham Minis (born 1820) (1820–1889), American merchant, great-grandson of the above